Clovis Asong (born 31 October 1994) is a British sprinter.

He won a gold medal in the 400 m at the 2011 Commonwealth Youth Games, beating World Youth Championship silver medalist Alphas Kishoyian. Asong added gold and silver medals at the 2011 European Youth Summer Olympic Festival.

He will represent the United Kingdom at the 2012 World Junior Championships in Athletics.

Asong first drew media attention for breaking the United Kingdom Under-15 400 metres record in only his second race.

References

External links

1994 births
Living people
British male sprinters